Keppel Street is a street in the London Borough of Camden that runs from the junction of Store Street and Gower Street in the west to Malet Street in the east. Before the construction of Senate House, it continued on to join Russell Square.

History
The street originally continued farther east to join Russell Square. It was joined on the north side by Torrington Street and Keppel Mews North, and on the south side by Russell Mews and the entrance to Keppel Mews South. It contained a chapel for Anabaptists.

British Museum Avenue was created in the early twentieth century, dividing the street, and replacing Torrington Street, Russell Mews and Keppel Mews South. British Museum Avenue was itself built over in the early 1930s when Senate House and other University of London buildings were constructed on the former eastern end of Keppel Street.

Buildings
The main entrance to the London School of Hygiene & Tropical Medicine is on the north side of Keppel Street. Malet Street Gardens is on the south side of the street.

The former Royal Institute of Chemistry building, now with a street address of 30 Russell Square, is at what was the eastern end of the street on the north side. A figure of Joseph Priestley by Gilbert Bayes may be seen above the doorway in the former Keppel Street.

Gallery

Popular Literature
Charlotte and Thomas Pitt, the main characters in Anne Perry's book series, lived in Keppel Street for several decades during the victorian era.

References

External links 

University of London
Streets in the London Borough of Camden